Højbrohus is an Art Nouveau-style building situated on the east side of Amagertorv, between Østergade and Store Kirkestræde, in the Old Town of Copenhagen, Denmark. It houses Café Norden on the two lower floors and a Hay flagship store on the second floor.

History

17th and 18th century

Store Lækkerbidsken, a hotel, was built at the site in 1656. It developed into the leading place of accommodation in the city.

The large property was listed in Copenhagen's first cadastre of 1689 as No. 31 in the city's East Quarter. It was owned by etatsråd Elias von Hübsch (-1793)at that time. The property was listed as No. 36 in the new cadastre of 1756 and belonged to vice mayor Grøn's widow at that time.

19th century7
 
The building was destroyed in the Copenhagen Fire of 1795. A new building with seven shops in the ground floor was completed at the site shortly thereafter,

The property was listed in the new cadastre of 1806 as No. 37 in the city's East Quarter. It belonged to commandant at Rosenborg Castle  Cæsar August Wilster (1734-1812) at that time.

The building would later become known as Peter Egholm's House (Isenkræmmer Peter Egholms Gaard) after one of its owners.

The current building
 
 

It was demolished in the mid-1890s to make way for the current building, Højbrohus, which was built in 1896 to design by Richard Bergmann (1860-1925).

Architecture
Højbrohus is built to an Art Nouveau-inspired design with many decorative details. A facade towards Amagertorv has a Dutch gable. The projecting central bay finishes in an onion domed spire, creating a tower-link silhouette against the rest of the building. The central "tower" is flanked by smaller, onion-domed turrets at the corners. The facade towards Amagertorv is also decorated with several reliefs and other ornamental details. 

The facades towards Østergade features a smaller Dutch gable as well as many other decorative details.

Today
Cafe Norden occupies the two lower floors of the building. Hay House, a Hay flagship store, is located on the second floor (Østergade 61)

See also
 Store Strandstræde 19-21

References

External links

Art Nouveau architecture in Copenhagen
Commercial buildings completed in 1896
1896 establishments in Denmark.